The Latin expression nolo episcopari is the traditional formal refusal made by a cleric in the Roman Catholic  and Anglican churches of an offer as appointment as a bishop. It means, literally, "I do not wish to be bishoped". A historical myth has arisen that it was customary and decorous for any candidate for a bishopric to decline the office twice by use of the expression, only a third use of which would indicate a true intention of refusal.

Henry Fielding in his 1749 novel The History of Tom Jones, a Foundling uses the phrase to show becoming modesty on the part of a lady asked for in marriage:

Sources
The World of Dr. Justice, blogspot, Sunday, September 22, 2013, Phrase of the Day: nolo episcopari

References

Latin religious words and phrases